Carlos Arias Torrico (born 26 August 1956) is a Bolivian footballer. He played in 17 matches for the Bolivia national football team from 1983 to 1989. He was also part of Bolivia's squad for the 1983 Copa América tournament.

References

1956 births
Living people
Bolivian footballers
Bolivia international footballers
Association football defenders
People from Germán Jordán Province